The ovate pebblesnail, scientific name Somatogyrus excavatus, is a species of very small freshwater snail with an operculum, an aquatic gastropod mollusk in the family Hydrobiidae. This species is endemic to the United States, and its natural habitat is rivers.

References

Molluscs of the United States
Somatogyrus
Gastropods described in 1906
Taxonomy articles created by Polbot